The 2016 Hong Kong Super Series was the twelfth Superseries tournament of the 2016 BWF Super Series. The tournament took place in Kowloon, Hong Kong from November 22–27, 2016 with a total prize money of $400,000.

Men's singles

Seeds

Top half

Bottom half

Finals

Women's singles

Seeds

Top half

Bottom half

Finals

Men's doubles

Seeds

Top half

Bottom half

Finals

Women's doubles

Seeds

Top half

Bottom half

Finals

Mixed doubles

Seeds

Top half

Bottom half

Finals

References

External links
 BWF World Superseries at www.bwfworldsuperseries.com
 Hong Kong Badminton Association Limited at www.hkopenbadminton.org

Hong Kong Open (badminton)
Hong Kong
2016 in Hong Kong sport